Platysphinx phyllis is a moth of the family Sphingidae. It is known from Sierra Leone to Nigeria.

References

Platysphinx
Moths described in 1903
Moths of Africa
Insects of West Africa
Fauna of the Central African Republic